Live in Barcelona may refer to:

 Live in Barcelona (Bruce Springsteen video)
 Live in Barcelona (Elton John video)